Richmond Dale (sometimes Richmondale) is a census-designated place in central Jefferson Township, Ross County, Ohio, United States. It has a post office with the ZIP code 45673.  It is located along U.S. Route 35 southeast of the county seat of Chillicothe.

History
Richmond Dale was laid out in 1811. The community derives its name from Richmond, Virginia, the native home of a first settler. A post office called Richmond was established in 1814, and the name was changed to Richmond Dale in 1829. The change in name was intended to prevent repetition with another Richmond, Ohio.

Education
Richmond Dale has a public library, a branch of the Chillicothe & Ross County Public Library.

Gallery

References

Unincorporated communities in Ohio
Unincorporated communities in Ross County, Ohio
1811 establishments in Ohio